Frank Hart Rich Jr. (born 1949) is an American essayist and liberal op-ed columnist, who held various positions within The New York Times from 1980 to 2011. He has also produced television series and documentaries for HBO.

Rich is currently writer-at-large for New York magazine, where he writes essays on politics and culture and engages in regular dialogues on news of the week for the "Daily Intelligencer". He served as executive producer of the long-running HBO comedy series Veep, having joined the show at its outset in 2011, and of the HBO drama series Succession.

Early life
Born on June 2, 1949, Rich grew up in Washington, D.C. His mother, Helene Fisher (née Aaronson), a schoolteacher and artist, was from a Russian Jewish family that originally settled in Brooklyn, New York, but moved to Washington after the stock market crash of 1929. His father, Frank Hart Rich, a businessman, was from a German Jewish family long-settled in Washington. He attended public schools and graduated from Woodrow Wilson High School in 1967.

Rich attended Harvard College in Cambridge, Massachusetts. At Harvard, he became the editorial chairman of The Harvard Crimson, the university's daily student newspaper. Rich was an honorary Harvard College scholar and a member of Phi Beta Kappa, and received a Henry Russell Shaw Traveling Fellowship. He graduated magna cum laude in 1971 with a Bachelor of Arts degree in American history and literature.

Career
Before joining The New York Times in 1980, Rich was a film and television critic for Time, a film critic for The New York Post, and film critic and senior editor of New Times Magazine. In the early 1970s, he was a founding editor of the Richmond (Va.) Mercury.

Theater criticism
Rich served as chief theater critic of The New York Times from 1980 to 1993, earning the nickname "Butcher of Broadway" for his supposed power over the prospects of Broadway shows. He first won attention from theater-goers with an essay for The Harvard Crimson about the Broadway musical Follies (1971), by Stephen Sondheim, during its pre-Broadway tryout run in Boston. In his study of the work, Rich was "the first person to predict the legendary status the show eventually would achieve". The article "fascinated" Harold Prince, the musical's co-director, and "absolutely intrigued" Sondheim, who invited the undergraduate to lunch to further discuss his feelings about the production.
 
In a retrospective article for The New York Times Magazine, "Exit the Critic," published in 1994, Rich reflected on the controversies during his tenure as drama critic as well as on the playwrights he championed and on the tragedies that decimated the New York theater during the height of the AIDS crisis. A collection of Rich's theater reviews was published in a book, Hot Seat: Theater Criticism for The New York Times, 1980–1993 (1998). He also wrote The Theatre Art of Boris Aronson, with Lisa Aronson, in 1987.

Rich's influence on Broadway shows is mentioned in the Tick, Tick... Boom! number "Play Game", featured in the 2021 film adaptation: "Write for the movies, write for TV. So what if it's crap? At least you won't write for free. Make thousands of dollars for a first draft. Your life won't depend on whether Frank Rich laughed".

Media and political criticism
From 1994 to 2011, Rich was an op-ed columnist for The New York Times; he wrote regularly on the connections between mass media and American politics. His columns, now appearing in New York Magazine, make regular references to a broad range of popular culture—including television, movies, theater and literature. In addition to his long-time work for the Times and New York, Rich has written for many other publications, including The New York Review of Books and The New Republic.

The commentator Bill O'Reilly, host of the Fox News Channel talk show The O'Reilly Factor, criticized Rich following Rich's criticism of Fox in 2004 as having a politically conservative bias.

Rich also attracted controversy by dismissing the historical-drama film The Passion of the Christ (2004), directed by Mel Gibson, as "nothing so much as a porn movie, replete with slo-mo climaxes and pounding music for the money shots."
 
In a January 2006 appearance on The Oprah Winfrey Show, commenting on the James Frey memoir scandal, Rich expanded on his usage in his column of the term truthiness to summarize a variety of ills in culture and politics. His book, The Greatest Story Ever Sold: The Decline and Fall of Truth from 9/11 to Katrina (2006), criticized the American media for what he perceived as its support of George W. Bush's administration's propaganda following the September 11, 2001 terrorist attacks and during the run-up to the Iraq war.

A July 2009 column focused on what Rich believes is the bigoted nature of President Barack Obama's detractors. On the Tea Party movement, which emerged in 2009, Rich opined that at one of their rallies they were "kowtowing to secessionists." He wrote that death threats and a brick thrown through a congressman's window were a "small-scale mimicry of "Kristallnacht" (or "night of broken glass", the November 1938 anti-Jewish pogrom in Nazi Germany and Austria). In his essays at New York, Rich has continued to examine the American right, including its latest revival during the candidacy and presidency of Donald Trump.

Television
Since 2008, Rich has been a creative consultant for HBO, where he helps initiate and develop new programming and is an Executive Producer of Veep, the long-running comedy series created by Armando Iannucci and starring Julia Louis-Dreyfus. He is also an Executive Producer of Succession, the HBO drama series created by Jesse Armstrong that debuted in June 2018 to critical praise.

Rich was also an Executive Producer for the HBO documentaries Six by Sondheim (2013), directed by James Lapine, and Becoming Mike Nichols (2016), directed by Douglas McGrath.

Awards
Rich's journalistic honors include the George Polk Award for commentary in 2005 and, in 2011, the Goldsmith Career Award for Excellence in Journalism from Harvard University (also his alma mater). In 2011, Rich was awarded an honorary doctorate from The New School. In 2016, he received the Mirror Award for Best Commentary from the Newhouse School at Syracuse University. He was inducted into the Theater Hall of Fame in 2015.

Rich was twice a Pulitzer Prize finalist, in 1987 and 2005. In 2010, he was awarded the Lifetime Achievement Award from the Silurians Press Club.

Rich received Emmy Awards in 2015, 2016, and 2017 for Veep, which was named Outstanding Comedy Series, and in 2020 for Succession, which was named Outstanding Drama Series. He also received a Golden Globe in 2020 for Succession, which won the Best Drama Series prize. He has won three Peabody Awards: for Succession in 2020, for Veep in 2017, and, in 2013, for Six by Sondheim, which was also honored with the ASCAP Deems Taylor Television Broadcast Award.

Criticism
In 2011, The New Republic included him along with Rachel Maddow and Ayn Rand as one of the "Most Over-Rated Thinkers" of the year, calling him "an utterly conventional pundit of the old salon liberal variety".

Personal life
Rich lives in Manhattan with his wife, Alex Witchel, an author and journalist; they married in 1991. He has two sons from his previous marriage to Gail Winston, Simon Rich, a novelist and short story writer who created the television series Man Seeking Woman and was a writer for Saturday Night Live, and Nathaniel Rich, who is a novelist, journalist, and essayist.

Memoir
 
Frank Rich's memoir Ghost Light (2000) chronicles his childhood in the late 1950s and 1960s in Washington, D.C., with a focus on his lifelong adoration of the theater and the impact it had on his life.

Bibliography
Rich, Frank; Aronson, Lisa (1987). The Theatre Art of Boris Aronson. New York: Knopf. .
Rich, Frank (1998). Hot Seat — Theater Criticism for The New York Times, 1980–1993. New York: Random House. .
Rich, Frank (2000). Ghost Light — A Memoir. New York: Random House. .
Rich, Frank (2006). The Greatest Story Ever Sold — The Decline and Fall of Truth from 9/11 to Katrina. New York: Penguin Press. .

References

External links
Column archive at New York magazine
Column archive at The New York Times
Column archive at The Harvard Crimson

1949 births
Living people
American columnists
American essayists
American people of German-Jewish descent
American people of Russian-Jewish descent
American political writers
American theater critics
Critics employed by The New York Times
George Polk Award recipients
The Harvard Crimson people
The New York Times columnists
Jewish American writers
Journalists from Washington, D.C.
People from Manhattan
Primetime Emmy Award winners
Harvard College alumni
Journalists from New York City
Woodrow Wilson High School (Washington, D.C.) alumni
Jewish American journalists
American male essayists
New York (magazine) people
21st-century American Jews